The Lower South West Football League is a country Australian rules football league incorporating teams from towns located within the South West and Great Southern regions of Western Australia.

History 

Australian Rules Football in the lower south west region of Western Australia has been played since the early part of the 20th century.  For the first half of the century, the two major leagues that existed in the region were the Nelson Football Association and the Warren Football Association.

The Nelson Football Association included teams from the areas of Bridgetown, Greenbushes, Balingup, Nannup and Boyup Brook.  The Warren Football Association was based in Manjimup and also included teams from the surrounding areas of Jardee, Pemberton, Northcliffe and Deanmill.  Other smaller leagues such as the Bridgetown and Nannup Football Associations also existed, but only for short periods of time.

The Lower South West Football League was formed in 1959, as a result of a merger between the Nelson Football Association and the Warren Football Association.  The merger of the two Associations was not easy with each league seeking to protect its interests and the clubs in each association were determined that they would not be overshadowed.  After several meetings and lengthy discussions, the League was officially formed on 31 March 1959.  The first league matches were scheduled for 26 April 1959, including reserves (B Grade) and colts (C Grade) matches.

Mr LW Gates, President of the Nelson Association prior to the merger, and one who played an important part in the merger, became the League's first President and Mr Joe Rowberry was elected vice president.

The inaugural teams included Boyup Brook, Bridgetown, Deanmill, Royals, Imperials, Tigers, Nannup and Southerners.  Several of these inaugural clubs resulted from mergers.  Bridgetown resulted from the merger of Warriors (maroon and yellow) and Rovers (red and blue), Tigers resulted from the merger of Jardee (green and gold) and Fire Brigades (blue and white), and Royals resulted from the merger of Greenbushes Centrals (blue and white) and Balingup (black and white).  Southerners were formed by the amalgamation of Pemberton (red and blue) and Northcliffe (white and red), the two southernmost towns in the district, thus the naming Southerners.

Nannup only competed for one year and Royals competed for five years, before both teams left to join the Blackwood Football Association.  The league remained as a six-team league for the next 44 years, when Kojonup joined the league in 2008 after transferring from the Great Southern Football League.  Kojonup were previously known as the Magpies and wore black and white, but were required to change their colours and adopt a new logo (Cougars) to avoid a clash with Manjimup Imperials.

The only changes to the league since then have been the changes of logos for Boyup Brook and Deanmill.  In 1987, Boyup Brook changed from being known as the Tigers to the Roos.  This was also accompanied by a change in colours (to green and white).  In 1997, Deanmill changed their nickname from The Mill to Hawks.

The official league colours were initially black and yellow, but have since changed to red, blue, green and yellow.  The league has competed in numerous country carnivals, including the Mobil and Wesfarmers Country Carnivals (held in Perth) and the Great Southern Carnival.

Current clubs

Former clubs

Grand final results

Club information

Boyup Brook - Competed in the Nelson Football Association from 1938 to 1958.  They were originally known as the Boyup Brook Tigers wearing yellow and black, but changed their nickname to the Roos and their colours to green and white in 1987.

Bridgetown - A single Bridgetown Football Club had existed since 1904 in the Nelson Football Association wearing blue and red, until the club split in the 1920s into the two clubs, Rovers and Warriors.   The Bridgetown Rovers (blue and red) and Bridgetown Warriors (maroon and yellow) both competed in the Nelson Football Association from 1921 to 1958.  The two clubs merged prior to the commencement of the LSWFL in 1959 to form the Bridgetown Bulldogs.

Deanmill - Founded in 1920 as No 1 Mill, changed to Deanmill in 1937. Deanmill later adopted the Hawks logo in 1997.

Imperials -  The earliest records available indicate that a Manjimup Football Club first played as a team in 1917.  The Manjimup Imperials Football Club first came into being in 1930 following the disbanding of the Manjimup Football Club, though the history of both are considered part of the club as it is now known.

Kojonup - Moved to the LSWFL from the Great Southern FL in 2008, also changing their name and colours from the Kojonup Magpies, wearing black and white, due to Manjimup Imperials already possessing both the logo and colours.  Kojonup originally came from the now defunct Central Great Southern FL before it was merged with the Southern Districts FL in 1990 to become the Great Southern FL.  Kojonup won 10 premierships in the Central Great Southern FL (in 1961, 1964–65, 1969, 1973–74, 1976, 1979, 1981 and 1988) and one premiership in the Great Southern FL (in 1997).  Kojonup won their first League premiership in the LSWFL in 2014.

Tigers - Prior to the commencement of the LSWFL in 1959, Jardee FC (green and yellow) and Fire Brigades FC (blue and white) merged to become the Tigers FC. At the start of the LSWFL Tigers were the most successful club, winning three of the first four league premierships (1959,1960 & 1962).

Southerners - Originally Pemberton Warriors and Pemberton Jayes merged to become Pemberton FC. Prior to the commencement of the LSWFL in 1959 Pemberton FC and Northcliffe FC merged to become Southerners FC.  Southerners are the most successful club with 20 league premierships, having never gone more than six years without winning a premiership.

Royals - Founding club from the Nelson FA.  Played 5 years in the LSWFL before later forming the Central Districts FA with Kirup FC, Nannup FC and Balingup FC. The Central Districts FA was later renamed the Blackwood FA sometime in the 1970s. Now defunct.

Nannup - Founding club from the Nelson FA. Played only one year in the LSWFL before later forming the Blackwood DFA (a.k.a. Central Districts FA) with Kirup FC, Greenbushes FC and Balingup FC. The league folded in the mid-1970s and Nannup went into recess. Re-formed in 1993 and joined the Onshore Cup competition.

Records 

The following records are current to the end of the 2019 season.

Ladders 

2002
																			

2003
																																				

2004
																												

2005
																			

2006
																																				

2007
																												

2008
																												

2009
																																				

2010
																												

2011
																												

2012
																																				

2013
																												

2014
																												

2015
																																				

2016
																																				

2017
																												

2018
																			

2019

References

Australian rules football competitions in Western Australia
Professional sports leagues in Australia
1959 establishments in Australia